The Lycopodiaceae (class Lycopodiopsida, order Lycopodiales) are an old family of vascular plants, including all of the core clubmosses and firmosses, comprising 16 accepted genera and about 400 known species. This family originated about 380 million years ago in the early Devonian, though the diversity within the family has been much more recent. "Wolf foot" is another common name for this family due to the resemblance of either the roots or branch tips to a wolf's paw.

Description
Members of Lycopodiaceae are not spermatophytes and so do not produce seeds. Instead they produce spores, which are oily and flammable, and are the most economically important aspects of these plants. The spores are of one size (i.e. the plants are isosporous) and are borne on a specialized structure at the apex of a shoot called a strobilus (plural: strobili), which resembles a tiny battle club, from which the common name derives. Members of the family share the common feature of having a microphyll, which is a "small leaf with a single vein, and not associated with a leaf gap in the central vascular system." In Lycopodiaceae, the microphylls often densely cover the stem in a linear, scale-like, or appressed fashion to the stem, and the leaves are either opposite or spirally arranged. The club mosses commonly grow to be 5–20 cm tall. The gametophytes
in most species are non-photosynthetic and myco-heterotrophic, but the subfamily Lycopodielloideae and a few species in the subfamily Huperzioideae have gametophytes with an upper green and photosynthetic part, and a colorless lower part in contact with fungal hyphae.

Taxonomy
The family Lycopodiaceae is considered to be basal within the Lycopodiopsida (lycophytes). One hypothesis for the evolutionary relationships involved is shown in the cladogram below.

Within the family, there is support for three subgroups. In 2016, Field et al. proposed that the primary division is between Lycopodielloideae plus Lycopodioideae and the Huperzioideae (names sensu PPG I). 

There are about 400 known species in the family Lycopodiaceae. Sources differ in how they group these into genera. Field et al. (2016) say "Most Lycopodiaceae species have been re-classified into different genera several times, leading to uncertainty about their most appropriate generic identification." In the PPG I system, the family has 16 accepted genera, grouped into three subfamilies, Lycopodielloideae, Lycopodioideae and Huperzioideae, based in part on molecular phylogenetic studies. The Huperzioideae differ in producing spores in small lateral structures in the leaf axils, and it has been suggested that they be recognized as a separate family. Other sources use fewer genera; for example, the three genera placed in the subfamily Huperzioideae in PPG I, Huperzia, Phlegmariurus and Phylloglossum, have also all been treated within a broadly defined Huperzia.

The species within this family generally have chromosome counts of n=34.  A notable exception are the species in Diphasiastrum, which have counts of n=23.

Genera
, the Checklist of Ferns and Lycophytes of the World recognized the following genera as members of Lycopodiaceae. All of these are recognized by the Pteridophyte Phylogeny Group classification of 2016 (PPG I), except for the genus Brownseya, described in 2021. Other classifications circumscribe the genera in the family more broadly, recognizing the subfamilies Lycopodielloideae, Lycopodioideae, and Huperzioideae as the genera Lycopodiella, Lycopodium, and Huperzia.

Subfamily Lycopodielloideae Wagner & Beitel 1992 ex Øllgaard
 Brownseya (Kunze) Li Bing Zhang, L.D.Sheph., D.K.Chen, X.M.Zhou & H.He
 Lateristachys Holub
 Lycopodiella Holub
 Palhinhaea Franco & Vasconcellos nom. cons.
 Pseudolycopodiella Holub
Subfamily Lycopodioideae Eaton sensu Wagner & Beitel ex Øllgaard
 Austrolycopodium Holub
 Dendrolycopodium Haines
 Diphasiastrum Holub
 Diphasium Presl ex Rothmaler
 Lycopodiastrum Holub ex Dixit
 Lycopodium  Linnaeus
 Pseudodiphasium Holub
 Pseudolycopodium Holub
 Spinulum Haines
Subfamily Huperzioideae Rothmaler sensu Wagner & Beitel ex Øllgaard
 Huperzia Bernhardi
 Phlegmariurus Holub
 Phylloglossum Kunze

Distribution and habitat 
The members of Lycopodiaceae are terrestrial or epiphytic in habit and are most prevalent in tropical mountain and alpine environments. Though Lycopodiaceae are most abundant in these regions, they are cosmopolitan, excluding arid environments.

Uses
The running clubmosses (Diphasiastrum) have long been used as greenery for Christmas decoration.
The spores have long been used as a flash powder.  See Lycopodium powder.
The spores have been used by violin makers for centuries as a pore filler.
In Cornwall, club mosses gathered during certain lunar phases were historically used as a remedy for eye disease.

References

External links

 
 Lycopodiaceae in Flora of North America

 
Plant families